Mediterraneo: The Law of the Sea is a 2021 Spanish-Greek drama film directed by Marcel Barrena, which stars Eduard Fernández, Dani Rovira, Anna Castillo, Sergi López, Àlex Monner and Melika Foroutan. It was theatrically released in Spain on 1 October 2021.

Premise 
Initially set in 2015, the plot consists of a dramatization of the genesis of the Open Arms rescue vessel by Òscar Camps. Moved by the image of a child drowned in the sea, two lifeguards travel to Lesbos, Greece. They proceed to set a rescue team to help people in need.

Cast

Production 
Produced by Lastor Media, Fasten Films, Arcadia Motion Pictures, Cados Producciones and Heretic, with the participation of  RTVE, Movistar+ and TVC, funding from the ICAA and the ICEC, and support from Creative Europe's MEDIA Programme. The film was directed by Marcel Barrena, whereas its screenplay was co-written by Barrena alongside Danielle Schleif. Kiko de la Rica was responsible for the cinematography. The score was composed by Arnau Bataller.

Shooting began on 4 September 2020. After shooting in Greece and Barcelona for 8 weeks, filming wrapped on 26 October 2020.

Release 
Distributed by DeAPlaneta, the film was theatrically released in Spain on 1 October 2021.

Reception 

Toni Vall of Cinemanía gave it 3½ out of 5 stars, considering that "the story is skilful, engaging, the image is impeccable, very solid". 

Blai Morell of Fotogramas rated it with 4 out of 5 stars, deeming it to be a "more than effective story that stirs consciences about a tragic reality", highlighting the trio of performances by Fernández Castillo and Rovira, while citing as negative points both some decisions vis-à-vis the mise-en-scène as well as the circumstance that the character performed by Monner ends up becoming somewhat blurred.

Quim Casas of El Periódico de Catalunya scored 2 out of 5 stars, considering that the film turn outs to be the "chronicle of an awareness-raising and ethical discovery" and also that Barrena minimizes some real tensions.

Deeming the film to be a "stirring factually-based drama", Wendy Ide of ScreenDaily considered that Eduard Fernández (as well as the film itself) is "most compelling in the sequences which depict the jagged terrors and the sheer grinding exhaustion of the maritime rescues". She also noted that the story was "a rather Eurocentric" chronicle of the crisis.

It was shortlisted to be the Spanish submission to the 94th Academy Awards alongside Parallel Mothers and The Good Boss, but the latter film was eventually selected.

Accolades 

|-
| align = "center" rowspan = "3" | 2021 || rowspan = "3" | 27th Forqué Awards || colspan = "2" | Best Fiction or Animation Picture ||  || rowspan = "3" | 
|-
| Best Film Actor || Eduard Fernández || 
|-
| colspan = "2" | Cinema and Education in Values || 
|-
| align = "center" rowspan = "10" | 2022 || 9th Feroz Awards || Best Actor (film) || Eduard Fernández ||  || 
|-
| rowspan = "1" | 77th CEC Medals || Best Actor || Eduard Fernández ||  || rowspan = "1" | 
|-
| rowspan = "7" | 36th Goya Awards || colspan = "2" | Best Film ||  || rowspan = "7" | 
|-
| Best Actor || Eduard Fernández || 
|-
| Best Original Song || "Te espera el mar" by María José Llergo || 
|-
| Best Original Score || Arnau Bataller || 
|-
| Best Cinematography || Kiko de la Rica ||  
|-
| Best Special Effects || || 
|-
| Best Production Supervision || Albert Espel, Kostas Sfakianakis || 
|-
| 9th Platino Awards || Best Cinematography || Kiko de la Rica ||  || 
|}

See also
 List of Spanish films of 2021

References

External links 
 Mediterráneo at ICAA's Catálogo de Cinespañol

2021 drama films
Films shot in Greece
Films set in Greece
Films shot in Spain
Films set in 2015
2020s Spanish-language films
Spanish drama films
Greek drama films
Works about the European migrant crisis
Arcadia Motion Pictures films
2020s Spanish films